Sudjai Cook (born 27 June 1976) is an Australian rules footballer who has played in the Australian Football League for the Adelaide Crows. He also played in the South Australian National Football League.

Early life
Cook was adopted at 10 weeks old from Thailand and moved to Australia.

AFL career
Deciding to embark on a career in Australian rules football, he played 7 games for the Norwood Football Club before being rookie listed in 1998 with the Australian Football League club, Adelaide. Debuting that year after being promoted to the senior list, he had the distinction of being the first Thai-born player ever to play in the AFL. The rover was known for his speed and dubbed "the Chef" by Seven Network commentator Sandy Roberts. He went on to play 7 games for the club before being delisted at the end of the year.

Post-AFL career
Cook played the majority of his SANFL career with the Glenelg Football Club in the SANFL, having transferred to that club from Norwood in 1999.  His SANFL career ended in 2005, after 26 games for Norwood and 122 games for Glenelg.

He was an assistant coach for the Broadview Football Club who play in the SAAFL. He was also playing for Broadview at the same time.

He went on to play for Flinders Park in the SAAFL until 2018.

Cook was red carded in a game against Golden Grove Reserves in 2015, for intentionally elbowing an opposition player in the jaw.

References

External links

1976 births
Living people
VFL/AFL players born outside Australia
Sudjai Cook
Thai emigrants to Australia
Australian adoptees
Australian rules footballers from South Australia
Norwood Football Club players
Glenelg Football Club players
Adelaide Football Club players